Keith Peter Thomas Francis Julian John Duffy (born 1 October 1974) is an Irish singer, actor, radio and television presenter and drummer who began his professional music career as part of Irish boy band Boyzone alongside Ronan Keating, Mikey Graham, Shane Lynch and Stephen Gately in 1993. The band decided to focus on solo projects in 2000 since which Duffy has achieved critical acclaim for his acting roles, particularly in soap operas such as Coronation Street and Fair City. He has also presented The Box and You're a Star.

Duffy has been an autism "awareness" campaigner since his daughter was diagnosed with the condition at age 18 months, and acts as the patron for Irish Autism Action holding regular fundraising events and informational talks.

Duffy was the winner on the British reality series The Door in 2010 and came third in the first series of Celebrity Big Brother in 2001, and in the second series of Splash! in 2014.

Early life 
Duffy was born on 1 October 1974 in Donaghmede, Dublin to parents Sean and Pat. He has an older brother, Derek, and a younger brother, John. He was raised Roman Catholic. As a young child he contracted pneumonia. Between the ages of 7 and 18 he played hurling and Gaelic football, representing the Dublin under 16 hurling team for three years. At the age of 16 he bought a drum kit and played in bands called Toledo Moon and This Burning Effigy. Duffy studied architecture for a year at college, before dropping out.

Career 

Duffy first became aware of Boyzone after hearing auditions to become a member were being held. He was unsuccessful in securing an audition, but was later noticed by Louis Walsh (who became the band's manager) whilst dancing in Dublin's POD Nightclub and was invited to audition. Duffy sang Billy Joel's "Piano Man" and danced to Right Said Fred's "I'm Too Sexy". He was chosen as one of the original members of the band. He played a backing role in Boyzone, with Ronan Keating and Stephen Gately handling the majority of lead vocals. In 1994, Duffy and fellow band member Shane Lynch were involved in a nearly fatal car crash; both survived without serious injuries. Boyzone performed together for the last time before their hiatus in Ireland at the Point Theatre during nine dates running from 3—8 January and 10—12 January 2000; they had sold more than 13 million records in total by this time and all sixteen of their singles had reached the top five of the UK Singles Chart. They also became the first Irish act to have four number one hits in the United Kingdom charts.

After Boyzone disbanded in 2000, Duffy teamed up with Shane Lynch and released their pop-rap version of "Girl You Know It's True" under the name Keith 'N' Shane. It was a top 40 hit in the UK, peaking at No. 36 in December 2000. Duffy's profile was raised as a result of his appearance on the first series of the UK's Celebrity Big Brother in 2001, where he finished third out of six, and on Lily Savage's Blankety Blank. In the same year, he appeared on the celebrity special in the fourth season of Fort Boyard alongside Tris Payne, Scott Wright, Sally Gray, and Nell McAndrew. He branched out to acting, most notably on the ITV soap opera Coronation Street as the character Ciaran McCarthy. What was meant to be a three-week stint on the show turned into three years from 2002 to 2005, with Duffy leaving the show to be closer to his family in Ireland.

The year 2005 saw Duffy take to the stage for the first time as Damien in the play Dandelions at Dublin's Olympia Theatre. Duffy also played the title role in The Wizard of Oz, staged at the Weymouth Pavilion in Weymouth, Dorset.

In May 2008, it was announced that Boyzone would return with their "Back Again... No Matter What" Tour which sold over 200,000 tickets within three hours. The tour began on 25 May 2008 at Belfast's Odyssey arena and finished at Carlisle Bitts Park on 23 August 2008. Duffy went on to play the part of James "Ringo" Leyden in 2008 in the Irish soap opera Fair City, with his character leaving the show in 2009. Boyzone then played their "Better" Tour, which was the last tour to feature member Stephen Gately. Duffy acted as pall-bearer at Gately's funeral on 16 October. Speaking after Gately's death, Duffy reminisced on the early days: "He told Louis [Walsh] he was 5ft 7in. When he auditioned for The Hobbit later on, he said he was 5ft 3in. But he was a true giant of a man".

Duffy became presenter of The Box on Irish television channel TV3, as well as featuring in Irish comedy Mrs Brown. He later served as a judge on the RTÉ talent contest You're a Star, later presenting the fifth series of the show.

Landing his first major feature-film role in 2010, Duffy was cast in Irish horror film Loftus Hall. He reportedly had to bow out of the production due a prior contract stipulation committing him to a 2010 Coronation Street return, which would have interfered with the film's schedule. Subsequently, he returned to the soap in February 2010, reprising his role as lovable Irish rogue Ciaran McCarthy.

On 2 and 3 April 2010, Duffy appeared in ITV's one-off game show The Door. He won the show and his prize was £25,000 for a charity of his choice – Ambitious about Autism (a UK-based charity for autism education, then known as TreeHouse). In June 2010, he continued his work with Autism, launching a mobile phone recycling campaign in Ireland. He also appeared on All Star Family Fortunes on 11 September 2010 again raising money for Ambitious about Autism.

After leaving Coronation Street in January 2011, Duffy returned to Boyzone who reunited and toured the UK and Ireland during February and March 2011, with a 21-date tour of the Ireland and UK with their arena-based "Brother" Tour and four outdoor shows around the UK during August. Following the end of the "Brother" Tour, Duffy completed a half Ironman Triathlon raising money for Irish Autism Action. He returned to Coronation Street in September 2011 for a short stint. His last appearance as Ciaran was on 25 November 2011.

From November 2011 to February 2012, Duffy played character Teddy Heelin in John B. Keane's play Big Maggie which visited many theatres in Ireland. Fellow Boyzone member Shane Lynch said in an interview on ITV show Loose Women that Boyzone would be releasing a new album and would be touring in 2013, the 20th anniversary of their formation.
In November 2013, he appeared as a drug dealing fitness instructor in two episodes of Irish crime drama Love/Hate.

2016–present: Boyzlife
Boyzlife is a duo consisting of Duffy and Brian McFadden, who previously appeared as members of '90s and '00s boybands Boyzone and Westlife, respectively.

In February 2020, Duffy invited John Junior, Mental Health Activist on stage with Brian McFadden on their Boyzlife tour to share his mental health journey with their fans. Junior travels around the United Kingdom with Charlie The Duck, who accompanies him, encouraging people to speak up about mental health. Duffy is friends with Junior and supports his campaign to raise awareness for mental health.

On 19 January 2022, the duo announced the release of their upcoming second studio album, Old School.

Personal life 
Duffy married Lisa Smith on 24 June 1998 in Las Vegas, only proposing two days before. Ronan Keating acted as his best man. Together, Keith and Lisa have two children, Jordan Stephen Scott Duffy (born 22 April 1996) and Mia Duffy (born 11 March 2000).
After Mia was diagnosed with moderate autism, Duffy has become active in "raising awareness" of the condition and in October 2014 received an Honorary Fellowship from the RCSI.

Duffy was also present in Kilcloon, Meath on 2 March 2012 for the official opening of 'Stepping Stones', a specialised school for children with autism stating "All we want to do is give our kids a chance in life".

Charity Work 
Following his daughter's diagnosis with autism at 22 months old in 2000,  he has supported different autism charities and campaigned for better support for autistic children in his native Ireland. He stepped down as patron of “Irish Autism Action” after ten years in 2015, raising over €8,000,000 for the organisation in that time. He subsequently began his own charity, the Keith Duffy Foundation, to support autism charities throughout Ireland.

In 2022 he played in the Celebrity Series of the Legends Tour golf tour at tournaments including the Staysure Senior PGA (2021) and the Celebrity Series Grand Final in Mauritius (2021 season, delayed to 2022), winning the event and £25,000 (€29,500) for the charity ASIAM.ie, which helps provide support for children with autism.

Filmography

Film and television

References

External links 
 Keith Duffy Experience – The place to be for Keith news!
 
 Boyzone-Central – Website Updated daily with all the latest news. Run by the fans for the fans

1974 births
20th-century Irish male singers
21st-century Irish male singers
Autism activists
Boyzone members
Irish game show hosts
Irish male soap opera actors
Irish pop singers
Living people
Male actors from Dublin (city)
RTÉ television presenters
Singers from Dublin (city)
Virgin Media Television (Ireland) presenters
You're a Star presenters
Irish health activists
Fellows of the Faculty of Nursing and Midwifery of the Royal College of Surgeons in Ireland
People from Donaghmede